Genesee Park Historic District is a national historic district located at Geneva in Ontario County, New York. The district contains 16 contributing properties including 14 contributing buildings, one contributing site, and one contributing object.  The focal point is Genesee Park, an informally landscaped village green.  The district includes a remarkably intact collection of mid- to late-19th century civic, domestic, and religious properties. There are two notable churches: the massive St. Peter's Episcopal Church (1868), designed by Richard Upjohn, and the former North Presbyterian Church (1875), both examples of the Gothic Revival style.

It was listed on the National Register of Historic Places in 2002.

References

Historic districts on the National Register of Historic Places in New York (state)
Gothic Revival architecture in New York (state)
Historic districts in Ontario County, New York
Geneva, New York
National Register of Historic Places in Ontario County, New York